Marina Germanovna Karpunina (born 21 March 1984) is a Russian basketball player. She was part of the Russian teams that won a bronze medal at the 2008 Olympics, as well as one gold and three silver medals at the world and European championships in 2005–2009. She was the Russian Best Young Player in 2004.

References 

Living people
Russian women's basketball players
Basketball players at the 2008 Summer Olympics
Olympic bronze medalists for Russia
Olympic basketball players of Russia
Olympic medalists in basketball
Medalists at the 2008 Summer Olympics
1984 births